CINEMATEK (Dutch: Koninklijk Belgisch Filmarchief; French: Cinémathèque royale de Belgique; English: Royal Belgian Film Archive) is a film archive in Brussels, Belgium.

The archive was established in 1938 under the name Royal Belgian Film Archive by Henri Storck, André Thirifays, and Piet Vermeylen.

Its collection include works on film by Man Ray, Duchamp and Léger. As of 2018, the archive held 47,726 films and over a hundred-thousand film materials, with over eight thousand of the items originating from Belgium. The challenges associated with managing the collection were discussed in a 2001 article by Gabrielle Claes who served as director of the archive from 1988 until 2011.

Cinematek led the organization of the EXPRMNTL film festival which was run four times: 1949, 1958, 1963, 1967, and 1974. The festival is depicted in the 2016 film Exprmntl which was shown in 2019 at the London Short Film Festival.

The Royal Belgian Film Archive is currently known as "Cinematek".

Curators 

 Jacques Ledoux, 1948 to 1988
 Gabrielle Claes, 1988 to 2011
 Nicola Mazzanti, 2012 to 2020
 Tomas Leyers 2020 to

References

External links
 ACE Association of European Film Archives and Cinematheques

1938 establishments in Belgium
Film archives in Europe
Archives in Belgium
FIAF-affiliated institutions